The 2007 Turkish Cup Final was a football match between Beşiktaş J.K. and Kayseri Erciyesspor. The match was played at the İzmir Atatürk Stadium for the 2nd time in a row. Beşiktaş won 1–0 after extra time.

Beşiktaş J.K.
As the defending Turkish Cup champions, Beşiktaş finished 2nd place in Group D, to proceed to the Quarter-finals. Beşiktaş beat Vestel Manisaspor 4-0 at home, and lost 0–2 away. In the Semi-finals Beşiktaş faced off, with one of their Istanbul rivals, Fenerbahçe S.K. At home, Beşiktaş won 1–0. Away Beşiktaş ended the match down 1–0. In extra time though, Mert Nobre scored a goal for Beşiktaş making it 1–1. Beşiktaş continued on to the final.

Kayseri Erciyesspor
Kayseri Erciyesspor finished 2nd place in Group A. In the Quarter-finals they faced Galatasaray. The 1st match ended 0–0 at home, and away 1-1. Kayseri Erciyes won by away goals. In the Semi-finals, Kayseri Erciyes faced Trabzonspor. The results were a 1–0 win away and a 1–1 draw at home. Kayseri Erciyes managed to 5–4 in the penalties, and proceed to the final.

Final
The game ended 0–0 after 90 minutes. During extra time Bobo scored the only goal of the game. Beşiktaş won their 7th Turkish Cup, and their second in a row.

Match details

References

Turkish Cup finals
Turkish Cuo
Turkish Cup final 2007
Turkish Cup final 2007